Lincolnshire Limestone may refer to

Lincolnshire Limestone (England), a Middle Jurassic geological formation in the East Midlands of England
Lincolnshire Limestone (Virginia), an Ordovician geological formation in Virginia, USA